This is a list of television and radio stations along with a list of media outlets in and around Toronto, Ontario, Canada, including the Greater Toronto Area.  Toronto is Canada's largest media market, and the fourth-largest market in North America (behind New York City, Los Angeles, and Chicago).

TV stations

The incumbent cable provider in the Toronto area is Rogers Cable, which originally secured the cable franchise for most of the pre-amalgamation city of Toronto, and later purchased the systems in surrounding areas. Since 2010, Bell Fibe TV (an IPTV terrestrial service operated by Rogers' rival Bell Canada) has been available in most neighbourhoods in the Greater Toronto Area. Independent IPTV television services such as Vmedia and Zazeen have also become available.

American network affiliates on Toronto cable are piped in from Buffalo, New York, including WGRZ (NBC), WIVB-TV (CBS), WKBW-TV (ABC), WUTV (Fox), and WNED-TV (PBS). For additional fees cable subscribers can also watch WNYO-TV (MyNetworkTV) and WNLO (The CW). Many of these stations can be seen over the air throughout the Greater Toronto Area.

Toronto has seven times the population of the Buffalo market.  In particular, WUTV and WNED rely heavily on viewership from Toronto; both have long identified as serving "Buffalo/Toronto," and also have sales offices in the city.  More than half of WNED's members live in Toronto.

Most of Canada's over-the-air and cable television networks also have national operations based in Toronto; for more information, see List of Canadian television channels.

Radio

Toronto stations

AM

FM

Other stations
Numerous radio stations licensed to communities outside the City of Toronto are also marketed to the City of Toronto proper, as well as the rest of the Greater Toronto Area.  This includes one American station.

AM

FM

Former stations
Please see former City of Toronto radio stations at the Canadian Communications Foundation.

 CFBN
 CFCA
 CHEV
 CJVF-FM
 CKAV-FM
 CKLN-FM
 CKO
 CKRG-FM

Print

Newspapers

National dailies

 The Globe and Mail
 National Post

Local dailies

 Corriere Canadese – Italian
 Toronto Guardian – English language 
 Korea Times – Korean (not to be confused with Korea Times)
 StarMetro (newspaper) – formerly Metro, Metro Today, GTA Today
 Ming Pao Daily News (明報) – traditional Chinese characters, with a moderate preference towards Cantonese in transliterations
 El Popular – Spanish
 Sing Tao Daily (星島日報) – traditional Chinese characters, with a moderate preference towards Cantonese in transliterations
 South Asian Observer CLOSED
 Today Daily news (現代日報) – traditional Chinese characters
 Toronto Star Toronto Sun World Journal (世界日報) – traditional Chinese characters, with a heavy preference towards Mandarin, especially as spoken in Taiwan, in transliterations

Alternative
 NOW Magazine — entertainment weekly

Community and weekly newspapers
Metroland Media Group is a subsidiary of Torstar Corporation which publishes the Toronto Star. Metroland publishes a series of weekly neighbourhood papers, some of which previously printed two or three times a week. They are distributed free of charge and have captured a large portion of the neighbourhood advertising flyer market. These newspapers are: Bloor West Villager, City Centre Mirror, East York/Beach Mirror, Etobicoke Guardian, North York Mirror, Parkdale-Liberty Villager, Scarborough Mirror and York Guardian.

Several independent community newspapers include the Town Crier and the Post City Magazines chain of monthly neighbourhood magazines, Beach Metro News, the Annex Gleaner, the Liberty Gleaner, West End Phoenix and the Marklander in the far west of Toronto.

Monthly broadsheet The Bulletin converted into an online-only outlet, now defunct.L'Express and Le Métropolitain are French-language weekly newspapers.

Ethnic and multicultural newspapers
 Ajit Weekly - Punjabi language
 CanIndia News - English language weekly
 The Contact Weekly - English language
 Correio da Manhã Canadá - Portuguese language twice-weekly
 Culture Magazin - Vietnamese and English language
 das Journal - German language, every two weeks
 Gazeta - Polish language weekly
 Gujarat Abroad - Canada's oldest and largest newspaper for the Gujarati community; weekly; published Fridays since 2002; caters to over 250K population mainly in the greater Toronto area through print and online e-paper;  mainly distributed to major Indian grocery stores and religious places
 India Journal - English language 
 Kanadai-Amerikai Magyars - Hungarian language weekly 
 Kanadan Sanomat - Finnish language weekly
 Milénio Stadium - Portuguese language, weekly
 Pakistan Post - Canada's largest and oldest Pakistani newspaper; weekly covering community news relevant to the South Asian community, mainly those from Pakistan; includes entertainment, news from abroad, regular columns, fashion and special features
 Russian Express - Russian language
 Salam Toronto - Persian-English weekly paper
Sol Português/Portuguese Sun - Portuguese language, weekly
 StarBuzz Weekly- entertainment and lifestyle weekly for South Asians; published in English from Toronto CLOSED
 Sunday Times - Urdu language weekly
 Thangatheepam - Tamil language weekly
 The Weekly Voice - Punjabi and Hindi news
 Thời Báo - Vietnamese language
 Thời Mới - Vietnamese language
 Urdu Khabarnama - Urdu language weekly
 Weekly Hankook - Korean language
 Wiadomości - Polish language weekly

Caribbean media
 Toronto Caribbean Newspaper - Toronto's Largest Caribbean Newspaper 
 The Caribbean Camera - Canada's largest newspaper on Caribbean affairs
 Caribbean Weekly - Canada's only Caribbean Entertainment newspaper
 Pride News Magazine - Canada's African and Caribbean Canadian newspaper
 Share - weekly community newspaper which has served the Black and Caribbean community in the greater Toronto area since April 9, 1978
 Vision Newspaper Canada - the double award-winning Caribbean community newspaper

Chinese media
 C C Times (加中時報) - simplified and traditional Chinese characters, with a moderate preference towards Mandarin as spoken in mainland China in transliterations; free weekly
 China Today Wen Wei Po (文匯報) - simplified Chinese characters
 Chinese Canadian Voice (社区報) - traditional Chinese characters; monthly
 Global Chinese Press (環球華報) - traditional Chinese characters; free weekly
 New Star Times (星星生活報) - traditional Chinese characters; free weekly

Latin media
 Latinos Multicultural Magazine - Bilingual (English/Spanish) Monthly Printed publication
 El Centro - Spanish weekly
 Toronto Hispano

Student newspapers

  Canadian University Press
 The Dialog - George Brown College
 East York Observer - Centennial College
 The Excalibur - York University
 The Eyeopener - Toronto Metropolitan University
 Humber Et Cetera - Humber College
 The Medium - University of Toronto
 The Newspaper - University of Toronto
 On the Record - Toronto Metropolitan University
 Senecan  - Seneca College
 The Scene - Seneca College
 The Strand - University of Toronto
 The Toronto Observer - Centennial College
 The Underground - University of Toronto
 The Varsity - University of Toronto
 The Woodsworth Howl - University of Toronto

Former newspapers

 The Globe - 1844 to 1936; merged with The Mail and Empire to form The Globe and Mail
 Grip - 1873 to 1894; satirical newsweekly
 The Leader - 1852 to 1878
 The Mail and Empire - 1895 to 1936; merged with The Globe to form The Globe and Mail
 The News - 1881 to 1919; changed name to The Times in March 1919, which lasted until September of that year
 The Sentinel - 1877 to 1896; newspaper of the Orange Order
 The Star Weekly - 1910 to 1973;  Sunday edition of the Toronto Star, later a weekend supplement in the Saturday Toronto Star
 The Telegraph - 1866 to 1872
 The Toronto World - 1880 to 1921; final weekday edition 9 April 1921; assets acquired by The Mail and Empire
Toronto Sunday World - absorbed by the Star Weekly in 1924
 Toronto Empire - 1887 to 1895; merged with The Mail to form The Mail and Empire
 The Toronto Mail - 1872 to 1895; merged with The Empire to form The Mail and Empire
 Toronto Telegram - 1876 to 1971; much of the staff then formed the Toronto Sun
 Eye Weekly / The Grid - defunct
 Toronto Special - appears defunct
 Xtra! - last print edition February 2015
 24 Hours — ceased publishing November 27, 2017

Magazines

 Canadian Living
 Canadian Business
 Chatelaine
 Elle 
 Exclaim!
 fab
 FASHION
 Foodism Toronto (magazine)
 FutuRéale
 Maclean's -  national magazine based in Toronto
 MoneySense
 Outlooks
 Saturday Night - no longer in print
 Shameless
 Spacing
 Sportsnet magazine
 This Magazine
 Toronto Life
 The Walrus
 Weddingbells
 Women's Post

Online-only

 BlogTO
 Curiocity 
 Narcity Media
 View the Vibe - also syndicated onto the TTC media portal "Tconnect".
 TRNTO - formerly known as Post City Magazines
 Dailyhive
 Best of Toronto
 Toronto.com
 Flare - formerly in print.
 WanderEater magazine
 Gent's Post

Book publishers

 Coach House Press
 Cormorant Books
 House of Anansi Press
 McClelland and Stewart
 Tundra Books
 University of Toronto Press
 ECW Press
 Optimum Publishing International

References

Toronto

Toronto-related lists